Anastasia Papadopoulou  (born 1 July 1986) is a female Greek football forward. She was part of the Greece women's national football team  at the 2004 Summer Olympics. 
On club level she played for Kavala 86.

See also
 Greece at the 2004 Summer Olympics

References

External links
 
 
 http://www.soccerpunter.com/players/99154-Anastasia-Papadopoulou
 http://loft6.photoshelter.com/image/I00006hjdNJE1ZXI
 http://www.gettyimages.com/detail/news-photo/greeces-anastasia-papadopoulou-fights-for-the-ball-with-news-photo/51169918#greeces-anastasia-papadopoulou-fights-for-the-ball-with-australias-picture-id51169918

1986 births
Living people
Greek women's footballers
Place of birth missing (living people)
Footballers at the 2004 Summer Olympics
Olympic footballers of Greece
Women's association football forwards
Greece women's international footballers